Sawai Madhopur is a city and Municipal Council (Nagar Parishad) in the Sawai Madhopur District in Rajasthan state, India. It is the administrative headquarters of Sawai Madhopur District of Rajasthan. Ranthambore National Park which is 7 km from the railway station and Ranthambore Fort, a UNESCO World Heritage Site are located near Sawai Madhopur.

History
Sawai Madhopur was built as a planned city by Maharaja Madho Singh I of Jaipur (1751  1768) and is named after him. Founded in 1763, Sawai Madhopur celebrates its foundation day annually on 19 January.

The Sawai Madhopur Lodge, now a hotel, survives as a relic of the days of tiger hunting. The lodge was built in 1936 by Maharaja Man Singh II (1912  1971) and used as a hunting lodge until his death. The two-storey crescent-shaped building is constructed with a long verandah. Queen Elizabeth of England visited the lodge in January 1961.

Geography
Sawai Madhopur is located in southeast Rajasthan.

Climate
Sawai Madhopur has a subtropical, dry climate with distinct winter, summer, and rainy seasons. The average rainfall in Sawai Madhopur is 800 mm with a monsoon season from July to October when Ranthambore National Park is closed. In summer, the average humidity is 10 to 15 percent and 60 percent in the rainy season. The ideal tourist season is from November to May.

Demographics

 India census of 2011, Sawai Madhopur had a population of 121,106. Females constituted 47 percent of the population and males 53 percent. Sawai Madhopur has an average literacy rate of 79.44 percent which is greater than the national rate of 74.04 percent. Female literacy (67.98 percent) lags the male literacy rate (90.09 percent). In Sawai Madhopur, 12.89 percent of the population is under 6 years of age. Sawai Madhopur's communities include Gurjars and Meenas.

Religion

Most people in Sawai Madhopur are Hindu. Just over 20 percent are Muslim. Christians are a very small minority. From a caste standpoint, 44 percent of Sawai Madhopur's population belong to the Meena Community and 12 percent are Gurjar.

Governance

The Nagar Parishad of Sawai Madhopur is the body responsible for the town's civil works and administration. The Municipal Corporation is headed by a chairman. Each of 60 wards is represented in the Municipal Corporation by an elected member. The Urban Improvement Trust (UIT) of Sawai Madhopur is the government agency responsible for the planning and development of the town.

Sawai Madhopur is one of four Assembly Constituencies within Sawai Madhopur District. The others are Gangapur, Bamanwas and Khandar. Sawai Madhopur lies in the Tonk-Sawai Madhopur Parliamentary Constituency.  political representative (MLA) of Sawai Madhopur is Danish Abrar. The Member of Parliament (MP) from Tonk-Sawai Madhopur Parliament Constituency is Sukhbir Singh Jaunapuria.

Economy
The economy of Sawai Madhopur is based on agriculture and hospitality. Factors affecting the economy have included the closure of a cement factory and the instituting of regulations protecting forests and the ecosystem. There are no large scale manufacturing plants in the town.

Guava is grown around Sawai Madhopur. In 1985, the first guava in the area was grown on a farm of five hectares in Karmoda Village. In 2015, the retail and the wholesale markets of guava generated more than 5 billion rupees of revenue. In 2015, five thousand hectares of land were dedicated to cultivating guava.

Other products from the region include those used for the extraction of essential oils and traditional medicines.

Fairs and festivals

Sawai Madhopur Utsav
The Sawai Madhopur Utsav is the annual celebration held on the foundation day of the city of Sawai Madhopur on 19 January. It is the day on which the city of Sawai Madhopur was established by Maharaja Sawai Madho Singh I in 1763.

The Ganesh Chaturthi Fair is the largest of Sawai Madhopur's fairs. It is celebrated over three days on Bhadav Shukla Chaturthi at the Ganesh Temple in Ranthambore Fort. Dussera is celebrated in Sawai Madhopur for 10 days in the month of October.

The Chauth Mata Mela fair is held in the month of January, at Chauth Mata Temple in Chauth Ka Barwara.

Culture
The languages commonly spoken in Sawai Madhopur are English, Hindi and Dhundari.

Typical dishes in Sawai Madhopur include Dal Baati Churma, Gatte ki sabzi, Bajre ki roti and Dal bade. The sweet dishes include Kharbuje ka laddoo.

Popular dance forms in Sawai Madhopur include the Ghoomar dance, the Sawai Madhopur dance and the Kalbeliya dance.

Places of interest

Ranthambore National Park

The Ranthambore National Park is one of the largest national parks in India. In 1955, it was established as the Sawai Madhopur Game Sanctuary. In 1973, the land became a Project Tiger reserve. The area was renamed the Ranthambore National Park in 1980. In 1984, the adjacent forests were declared the Sawai Man Singh Sanctuary and Keladevi Sanctuary, and in 1991 the tiger reserve was enlarged to include Sawai Man Singh and Keladevi sanctuaries.

Ranthambore Fort

The history of Sawai Madhopur is closely linked to that of Ranthambore Fort. The date of its construction is unknown. The fort provides an oasis in an area of arid land. In medieval times, it was a defence against forces such as those of Delhi and Agra. In 1296 CE, Rao Hamir held the fort. Notable features of the fort include the Toran Dwar, Mahadeo Chhatri, Sameton Ki Haveli, the 32 pillared Chhatri, Mosque, and Ganesh Temple.

Chauth Mata Temple
The largest Chauth Mata Temple is located in Chauth Ka Barwara, Sawai Madhopur. Chauth Mata is the Kuldevi of the Meena community. The Chauth Mata Mandir is located on a hilltop of Chauth Ka Barwada, 25 km from Sawai Madhopur district.

Meen Bhagwan
This temple, dedicated to Lord Meenesh i.e. Matsyavatar, is located in the town of Chauth Ka Barwara of Sawai Madhopur district. This grand temple built with the support of Meena Samaj of Barwara area of Chauth is equipped with modern facilities. The entire temple is built with white marble. The 108 feet high dome of this temple of Lord Meenesh remains the main attraction for visitors. The temple also houses a dharmshala of the Meena community. The construction of the temple, built without government aid, was financed by donations of 7 Crore rupees by the Meena community.

Rajiv Gandhi Regional Museum of Natural History

On 23 December 2007, the foundation stone laying ceremony of Rajiv Gandhi Regional Museum of Natural History in Sawai Madhopur, was officiated by Hamid Ansari, Vice President of India. The museum focuses on the environment of the western arid region of India.

Chamatkarji Jain temple 

Chamatkarji Jain temple is located in Alanpur village. The temple dates back to the early medieval period. It is built in the Pancharatha style with main shrine housing the idol of Rishabhanatha.

Shilpgram
Shilpgram is Sawai Madhopur's rural arts and crafts complex. It is a living ethnographic museum of the West Zone of India which includes five states. Special emphasis is laid on workshops for children on arts, crafts, theatre, and music.

Temples
The Galta temple is a historic Shri Ram-Sita temple in the old city. Guavas are grown in the 40 km region around the city. Another popular temple close by is the Balaji temple of Itawa village, dedicated to Hanuman.

Education

Institute of Hotel Management
On 1 September 2015, the Government of India inaugurated an Institute of Hotel Management at Sawai Madhopur to develop the hospitality sector and promote tourism.

Colleges
 Institute of Hospitality Management
 Sawai Madhopur College of Engineering and Technology
 Government PG College
 Government Polytechnic College
 Gulshan College of Nursing
 Vinayak international school

Organizations and NGOs
 Gramin Shiksha Kendra
 Dastkar Ranthambhore
 Princess Diya Kumari Foundation
 Prakritik Society
 Access Development Services - works with local farmers and women artisans.
 2nd Inning Naya Savera old age home

Transportation

Air
Sawai Madhopur has an airstrip used by private jets. Supreme Airlines has started regular flight operations between Sawai Madhopur and Delhi from 11 April 2018.

Rail

Sawai Madhopur Junction is located on the Delhi to Mumbai trunk route. The city is a stop for many trains, including Jaipur - Indore Super-Fast, Dayodaya Express (Ajmer - Jabalpur Express), Jodhpur - Indore Intercity, Hazrat Nizamuddin - Indore Express, Marusagar Express (Ajmer - Ernakulam Express / Ernakulam Express), Jaipur - Mysore Express, Jaipur - Chennai Express, Jaipur - Coimbatore Express, Jodhpur - Puri Express, Jodhpur - Bhopal Express, Jodhpur - Indore Intercity, and the August Kranti Rajdhani Express.

The Jaipur - Indore Super-Fast connects Sawai Madhopur to Indore, a major city in Madhya Pradesh. There is also a Jan Shatabdi Express train from Sawai Madhopur to the national capital, Delhi. The Kota - Patna Express connects Sawai Madhopur and Patna cities via Agra, Kanpur, Lucknow, and Varanasi. Other trains include the Kota - Hanumangarh Express, the Sawai Madhopur-Mathura Passenger and the Jaipur-Bayana Passenger. 

The Mumbai-Nizamuddin August Kranti Rajdhani Express halts at Sawai Madhopur for 2 minutes.

Luxury trains include the Palace on Wheels, the Royal Rajasthan on Wheels, and the Indian Maharaja which makes a stop at Sawai Madhopur on an eight-day round trip to tourist destinations.

Roads

The National Highway 552 (Tonk-Sawai Madhopur) and the Kota-Lalsot Mega Highway pass through the city.

Media
The largest circulated daily newspapers in Sawai Madhopur are the Rajasthan Patrika and Dainik Bhaskar. The All India Radio (AIR / Akashvani) and the local FM radio station, 101.5 MHz broadcast programs in Hindi and Rajasthani.

See also
 Ghushmeshwar Temple
 Chauth Mata Temple
 Bonli
 Pilauda
 Ranthambore National Park
 Ranthambore Fort
 Rajiv Gandhi Regional Museum of Natural History
 Shilpgram, Sawai Madhopur
 Sawai Madhopur railway station
 Sawai Madhopur District

External links

 SawaiMadhopur Police
 Sawai Madhopur District Court

References

 
Cities and towns in Sawai Madhopur district